The Bad Guys: Reign of Chaos is a 2019 South Korean action comedy film directed by Son Yong-ho, based on the OCN hit drama series Bad Guys. The film stars Ma Dong-seok, Kim Sang-joong, Kim Ah-joong and Jang Ki-yong.

Plot
During an inmate transportation, several policemen are attacked and killed by assassins, where a former gangster's boss named No Sang-sik is freed. After capturing some of the prisoners, Oh Goo-tak, the former boss of an unusual special forces unit called "Crime Unit" is called by the head officer. The head officer tells that Sang-Sik was about to testify the real leader of the Yakuza, and tells Oh to reassemble his unit and capture them. Oh hires Woong-Cheol, a former crimefighter serving time in prison, and Yoo-Sung, a former police officer to capture them.

The duo are also promised for a reduction of their prison sentence if they manage to capture them. The unit soon manage to capture one of the prisoner named Kwak No-soon/Jessica, who later becomes a part of the unit as she has useful information which helps the team to close in one of the escaped prisoner named Kim Chang-min. The unit manages to track Kim, where Detective Choi arrests him, thus interfering in their operation. It is revealed that Woong-cheol accepted this mission, as he wants to settle a score with the gangster's boss for killing his best friend Nam Myeong-seok.

After admitting Oh to the hospital due to liver cancer, The unit manages to retrieve Kim from the police station and also other prisoners, including Sang-sik, They interrogate Sang-sik and learn that the Yakuza leader's real name is Yoshihara, and reveals that Yoshihara had killed Myeong-seok for protesting against his drug operations. Sang-sik felt guilty and decided to testify against Yoshihara by listing about his operations in his diary. However, the head officer; revealed to be Yoshihara's mole, retrieves the diary and kills Sang-sik, and leaves the unit to die in a fire accident, but they manage to escape.

Meanwhile, Choi helps the unit to trace Yoshihara's location in a factory. Along with Woong-Cheol's friend, the unit attacks the basement and defeats Yoshihara's goons. Woong-Cheol confronts Yoshihara and brutally thrashes him for Myeong-seok's death. Yoshihara and his men, along with the head officer are arrested. Oh gets recovered from his cancer, and gets encouraged by Woong-Cheol to work again. The next day, Oh arrests Yoshira's associates and the team's prison sentence are reduced while Woong-Cheol is hired for another mission.

Cast
 Ma Dong-seok as Park Woong-cheol
 Kim Sang-joong as Oh Gu-tak
 Kim Ah-joong as Kwak No-soon / Jessica
 Jang Ki-yong as Ko Yoo-sung 
 Park Won-sang as Kim Chang-sik
 Park Hyung-soo as Park Sung-tae
 Bang Jae-ho as Young police officer	
 Kang Min-tae as Warehouse gangster 1 
 Kang Ye-won as Yoo Mi-yeong (cameo)
 Kong Jung-hwan as Nam Myeong-seok (special appearance)
 Kim Hye-yoon as Oh Ji-yun (Oh Gu-tak's daughter) (special appearance)
 Ji Seung-Hyun as Nam Young-Gyu

Production 
Principal photography began on September 10, 2018, and wrapped on January 11, 2019.

References

External links

2019 films
2019 crime action films
South Korean crime action films
CJ Entertainment films
2010s Korean-language films
2010s South Korean films
Yakuza films